My Aunts and I (French: Mes tantes et moi) is a 1937 French comedy film directed by Yvan Noé and starring René Lefèvre, Marguerite Moreno and Jacqueline Francell. Three Aunts keep a close watch on their nephew's romantic developments.

The film's sets were designed by the art director Marcel Magniez.

Cast
 René Lefèvre as Eloi  
 Marguerite Moreno as Tante Adèle  
 Jacqueline Francell as Lisette  
 Tramel as Jolibois  
 Pierrette Caillol as Monette  
 Maximilienne as Tante Julie  
 Nine Assia as Simone  
 Michèle Morgan as Michèle  
 Peggy Bonny as Le soubrette  
 Jacques Deluard as Fredo  
 Maurice Mosnier as Robert  
 Pierre Huchet 
 Paul Asselin as Le greffier  
 Alice Tissot as Tante Lucie

References

Bibliography 
 Rège, Philippe. Encyclopedia of French Film Directors, Volume 1. Scarecrow Press, 2009.

External links 
 

1937 films
French comedy films
1937 comedy films
1930s French-language films
Films directed by Yvan Noé
French black-and-white films
1930s French films